John Ferris may refer to:
 J. J. Ferris (John James Ferris, 1867–1900), Australian cricketer
 John Ferris (New Brunswick politician) (1811–1884), Canadian politician, represented Queen's, New Brunswick
 John Ferris (Ontario politician) (born 1930s), Canadian politician, represented London South
 John Ferris (swimmer) (1949–2020), American swimmer